Walter Donald McClaskey (July 29, 1918 – July 16, 1988) was a member of the Ohio House of Representatives.

References

External links

1918 births
Republican Party members of the Ohio House of Representatives
1988 deaths
20th-century American politicians